Thomas France (born June 15, 1951) is an American attorney and politician serving as a member of the Montana House of Representatives from the 94th district. Elected in November 2020, he assumed office on January 4, 2021.

Early life and education 
France was born in Minneapolis, Minnesota. He earned a Bachelor of Arts degree in history and political science and a Juris Doctor from the University of Montana .

Career 
France joined the National Wildlife Federation in 1981 as a staff attorney. He has since worked as regional executive director of the Northern Rockies, Prairies, and Pacific Regional Center. He was elected to the Montana House of Representatives in November 2020. He assumed office on January 4, 2021, succeeding Kimberly Dudik.

References 

University of Montana alumni
Montana lawyers
Democratic Party members of the Montana House of Representatives
1951 births
Living people